Rádio Top 100 Oficiálna is the official chart of Slovakia, ranking the top songs based on radio airplay as compiled and published weekly by the Slovak national section (SNS IFPI). Beginning in 2010, IFPI Czech Republic took over that responsibility.

Below are the songs that reached number one on the chart from September 2006 through December 2009.

Number-one songs

See also 
2000s in music
List of number-one songs of the 2000s (Czech Republic)

References

Slovakia
2000s